Mistral Solutions Pvt. Ltd. is a privately held product design and systems engineering company with a focus on embedded domains. Founded in 1997 by Anees Ahmed and Rajeev Ramachandra, the Indian company was acquired by Axicades Technologies in December 2022.

It offers end-to-end services for embedded design and development in two domains: product engineering services and defense solutions. As of April 2018, Mistral has more than 350 employees providing services across industry verticals like defense and aerospace, wearables, consumer electronics, biometrics, semiconductor support, medical and assistive technology, wireless, automotive electronics, home automation, industrial automation, telecom & networking and homeland security.

It is headquartered in Bengaluru, India with regional offices in Delhi and Hyderabad. The company's US subsidiary, Mistral Solutions Inc., has its headquarters in Fremont, California, with a regional office in Dallas, Texas.

History
Mistral Solutions started operations as a value-added reseller for Wind River real-time operating systems and other COTS products in India. The company also offered design services by providing reference designs on the Analog Devices platforms and worked on data acquisition and signal processing related defense projects for various DRDO laboratories in the country. It later expanded its operations to the global market with a dedicated hardware and software design services team catering to the embedded electronics and systems arena.

In 2001, Mistral received a series A funding of 3.5 Million USD from eTec Ventures and established Mistral Software Inc. in USA.  In 2004, Mistral entered into a strategic alliance with Curtiss-Wright Embedded Computing which is today Curtiss-Wright Defense Solutions. It received its second round of funding in 2008 of USD 6.5 Million from Nexus Ventures Partners and JAFCO Asia. Both the companies exited in Nov 2017.

Services
The company specializes in Board Design, FPGA Design, Firmware, Device Drivers and BSP (Board support packages) development, Middleware and Embedded application development, System Integration, Production Support and Product Lifecycle Management. The services offered range from front-end consulting and planning to developing, integrating and managing turnkey technology solutions.

Products
In addition to services, they also work on Development Platforms, Reference designs, Evaluation Modules and Product on Modules. This includes TMDXEVM8148, AM/DM37x EVM, RTM-BOC, AM437x Product on Module (PoM) and Nano System on Modules (i.MX6 NanoSOM, 820 NanoSOM, AM65x Industrial SOM  and 60 GHz mmWave Industrial RADAR Module ).

Partners
Mistral’s partners include Analog Devices, Texas Instruments, Xilinx, Qualcomm, ARM, Intel, Microsoft, Freescale Semiconductors, Wind River Systems, NVidia, Lattice Semiconductor, Curtiss-Wright Defense Solutions, RTI, Zetron, Rinicom, Amper and Esterel Technologies among others.

Awards and recognitions
Mistral was the Winner of NASSCOM Innovation Award – 2007
In 2007, Mistral won the title of "Global Services’ Top 5 Emerging Services Provider"
In 2008, Mistral was the Winner of Red Herring Asia 100
In 2009, Mistral featured in the NASSCOM’s "Top 50 IT Innovators" list
In 2010, Mistral was featured in the FedEx IBL ‘International Business League’
Mistral won the STPI Karnataka IT Exports Award in 2012
In 2012, Mistral was among the Global Services 100 Provider
In 2017, Mistral was awarded the DRDO Defense Technology Absorption Awards
In 2020, Mistral was awarded the SBI General Insurance SME Awards 2020, partnered by Times Network in the Electricals & Engineering category

See also

 List of companies of India

References

External links
 
Companies based in Bangalore
Indian companies established in 1997
1997 establishments in Karnataka
2022 mergers and acquisitions